Hercostomus is a genus of flies in the family Dolichopodidae. It is a large genus, containing more than 483 species worldwide.

Species groups
The genus currently includes the following species groups, at least 25 of which are known from China:
 Hercostomus abnormis group – China
 Hercostomus absimilis group – China
 Hercostomus albidipes group – China
 Hercostomus apiculatus group – China
 Hercostomus baishanzuensis group – China
 Hercostomus biancistrus group – China
 Hercostomus crassivena group – China
 Hercostomus curvus group – China
 Hercostomus cyaneculus group – China
 Hercostomus digitatus group – China
 Hercostomus digitiformis group – China
 Hercostomus fatuus group – China
 Hercostomus flavimaculatus group – China
 Hercostomus flaviventris group – China
 Hercostomus fluvius group – China
 Hercostomus hamatus group – China(?)
 Hercostomus incisus group – China
 Hercostomus intactus group – China
 Hercostomus longicercus group – China
 Hercostomus longus group – China
 Hercostomus nanlingensis group – China
 Hercostomus plagiatus group – Palearctic
 Hercostomus prolongatus group – China
 Hercostomus quadriseta group – China
 Hercostomus shennongjiensis group – China(?)
 Hercostomus subnovus group – China
 Hercostomus takagii group – China
 Hercostomus ulrichi group – China

The Palearctic species of Hercostomus are traditionally separated into five numbered groups, based on the coloration of the femora, postocular setae and antennae:
 Group I: Femora yellow; lower postocular setae yellow or white; antennae partly yellow
 Group II: Femora yellow; lower postocular setae yellow or white; antennae black
 Group III: Femora yellow; lower postocular setae black
 Group IV: Femora black; lower postocular setae yellow or white
 Group V: Femora black; lower postocular setae black

In 1999, Igor Grichanov divided the Afrotropical species of Hercostomus into three numbered groups. Two of these have since been separated into their own genera:
 Group I: now Afrohercostomus
 Group II: considered part of Hercostomus sensu stricto
 Group III: now Neohercostomus

See also
 List of Hercostomus species

References 

Dolichopodidae genera
Dolichopodinae
Taxa named by Hermann Loew